Curicta pronotata is a species of waterscorpion in the family Nepidae. It is found in Central America and North America.

References

Further reading

 

Articles created by Qbugbot
Insects described in 1949
Nepidae